A fossil fuel is a hydrocarbon-containing material formed naturally in the Earth's crust from the remains of dead plants and animals that is extracted and burned as a fuel. The main fossil fuels are coal, oil, and natural gas. Fossil fuels may be burned to provide heat for use directly (such as for cooking or heating), to power engines (such as internal combustion engines in motor vehicles), or to generate electricity. Some fossil fuels are refined into derivatives such as kerosene, gasoline and propane before burning. The origin of fossil fuels is the anaerobic decomposition of buried dead organisms, containing organic molecules created by photosynthesis. The conversion from these materials to high-carbon fossil fuels typically require a geological process of millions of years.

In 2019, 84% of primary energy consumption in the world and 64% of its electricity was from fossil fuels. The large-scale burning of fossil fuels causes serious environmental damage. Over 80% of the carbon dioxide (CO2) generated by human activity comes from burning them: around 35 billion tonnes a year, compared to 4 billion from land development.  Natural processes on Earth, mostly absorption by the ocean, can only remove a small part of this. Therefore, there is a net increase of many billion tonnes of atmospheric carbon dioxide per year. Although methane leaks are significant, the burning of fossil fuels is the main source of greenhouse gas emissions causing global warming and ocean acidification. Additionally, most air pollution deaths are due to fossil fuel particulates and noxious gases. It is estimated that this costs over 3% of the global gross domestic product and that fossil fuel phase-out will save millions of lives each year.

Recognition of the climate crisis, pollution and other negative impacts caused by fossil fuels has led to a widespread policy transition and activist movement focused on ending their use in favor of sustainable energy. However, because the fossil-fuel industry is so heavily integrated in the global economy and heavily subsidized, this transition is expected to have significant economic impacts. Many stakeholders argue that this change needs to be a just transition and create policy that addresses the societal burdens created by the stranded assets of the fossil fuel industry.

International policy, in the form of United Nations sustainable development goals for affordable and clean energy and climate action, as well as the Paris Climate Agreement, is designed to facilitate this transition at a global level. In 2021, the International Energy Agency concluded that no new fossil fuel extraction projects could be opened if the global economy and society wants to avoid the worst impacts of climate change and meet international goals for climate change mitigation.

Origin

The theory that fossil fuels formed from the fossilized remains of dead plants by exposure to heat and pressure in Earth's crust over millions of years was first introduced by Andreas Libavius "in his 1597 Alchemia [Alchymia]" and later by Mikhail Lomonosov "as early as 1757 and certainly by 1763".  The first use of the term "fossil fuel" occurs in the work of the German chemist Caspar Neumann, in English translation in 1759. The Oxford English Dictionary notes that in the phrase "fossil fuel" the adjective "fossil" means "[o]btained by digging; found buried in the earth", which dates to at least 1652, before the English noun "fossil" came to refer primarily to long-dead organisms in the early 18th century.

Aquatic phytoplankton and zooplankton that died and sedimented in large quantities under anoxic conditions millions of years ago began forming petroleum and natural gas as a result of anaerobic decomposition. Over geological time this organic matter, mixed with mud, became buried under further heavy layers of inorganic sediment. The resulting high temperature and pressure caused the organic matter to chemically alter, first into a waxy material known as kerogen, which is found in oil shales, and then with more heat into liquid and gaseous hydrocarbons in a process known as catagenesis. Despite these heat-driven transformations, the energy released in combustion is still photosynthetic in origin.

Terrestrial plants tended to form coal and methane. Many of the coal fields date to the Carboniferous period of Earth's history. Terrestrial plants also form type III kerogen, a source of natural gas. Although fossil fuels are continually formed by natural processes, they are classified as non-renewable resources because they take millions of years to form and known viable reserves are being depleted much faster than new ones are generated.

Importance

Fossil fuels have been important to human development because they can be readily burned in the open atmosphere to produce heat. The use of peat as a domestic fuel predates recorded history. Coal was burned in some early furnaces for the smelting of metal ore, while semi-solid hydrocarbons from oil seeps were also burned in ancient times, they were mostly used for waterproofing and embalming.

Commercial exploitation of petroleum began in the 19th century.

Natural gas, once flared-off as an unneeded byproduct of petroleum production, is now considered a very valuable resource. Natural gas deposits are also the main source of helium.

Heavy crude oil, which is much more viscous than conventional crude oil, and oil sands, where bitumen is found mixed with sand and clay, began to become more important as sources of fossil fuel in the early  2000s. Oil shale and similar materials are sedimentary rocks containing kerogen, a complex mixture of high-molecular weight organic compounds, which yield synthetic crude oil when heated (pyrolyzed). With additional processing, they can be employed instead of other established fossil fuels. During the 2010s and 2020s there was disinvestment from exploitation of such resources due to their high carbon cost relative to more easily-processed reserves.

Prior to the latter half of the 18th century, windmills and watermills provided the energy needed for work such as milling flour, sawing wood or pumping water, while burning wood or peat provided domestic heat. The wide-scale use of fossil fuels, coal at first and petroleum later, in steam engines enabled the Industrial Revolution. At the same time, gas lights using natural gas or coal gas were coming into wide use. The invention of the internal combustion engine and its use in automobiles and trucks greatly increased the demand for gasoline and diesel oil, both made from fossil fuels. Other forms of transportation, railways and aircraft, also require fossil fuels. The other major use for fossil fuels is in generating electricity and as feedstock for the petrochemical industry. Tar, a leftover of petroleum extraction, is used in the construction of roads.

The energy for the Green Revolution was provided by fossil fuels in the form of fertilizers (natural gas), pesticides (oil), and hydrocarbon-fueled irrigation. The development of synthetic nitrogen fertilizer has significantly supported global population growth; it has been estimated that almost half of the Earth's population are currently fed as a result of synthetic nitrogen fertilizer use. According to head of a fertilizers commodity price agency, "50% of the world's food relies on fertilisers."

Environmental effects

The burning of fossil fuels has a number of negative externalitiesharmful environmental impacts where the effects extend beyond the people using the fuel. The actual effects depend on the fuel in question. All fossil fuels release  when they burn, thus accelerating climate change.  Burning coal, and to a lesser extent oil and its derivatives, contribute to atmospheric particulate matter, smog and acid rain.

Climate change is largely driven by the release of greenhouse gasses like , with the burning of fossil fuels being the main source of these emissions. In most parts of the world climate change is negatively impacting ecosystems. This includes contributing to the extinction of species and reducing people's ability to produce food, thus adding to the problem of world hunger. Continued rises in global temperatures will lead to further adverse effects on both ecosystems and people, with the World Health Organization having stated climate change is the greatest threat to human health in the 21st century.

Combustion of fossil fuels generates sulfuric and nitric acids, which fall to Earth as acid rain, impacting both natural areas and the built environment. Monuments and sculptures made from marble and limestone are particularly vulnerable, as the acids dissolve calcium carbonate.

Fossil fuels also contain radioactive materials, mainly uranium and thorium, which are released into the atmosphere. In 2000, about 12,000 tonnes of thorium and 5,000 tonnes of uranium were released worldwide from burning coal. It is estimated that during 1982, US coal burning released 155 times as much radioactivity into the atmosphere as the Three Mile Island accident.

Burning coal also generates large amounts of bottom ash and fly ash. These materials are used in a wide variety of applications (see Fly ash reuse), utilizing, for example, about 40% of the United States production.

In addition to the effects that result from burning, the harvesting, processing, and distribution of fossil fuels also have environmental effects. Coal mining methods, particularly mountaintop removal and strip mining, have negative environmental impacts, and offshore oil drilling poses a hazard to aquatic organisms. Fossil fuel wells can contribute to methane release via fugitive gas emissions. Oil refineries also have negative environmental impacts, including air and water pollution. Coal is sometimes transported by diesel-powered locomotives, while crude oil is typically transported by tanker ships, requiring the combustion of additional fossil fuels.

A variety of mitigating efforts have arisen to counter the negative effects of fossil fuels. This includes a movement to use alternative energy sources, such as renewable energy. Environmental regulation uses a variety of approaches to limit these emissions; for example, rules against releasing waste products like fly ash into the atmosphere.

In December 2020, the United Nations released a report saying that despite the need to reduce greenhouse emissions, various governments are "doubling down" on fossil fuels, in some cases diverting over 50% of their COVID-19 recovery stimulus funding to fossil fuel production rather than to alternative energy. The UN secretary general António Guterres declared that "Humanity is waging war on nature. This is suicidal. Nature always strikes backand it is already doing so with growing force and fury." However, Guterres also said there is still cause for hope, anticipating Joe Biden's plan for the US to join other large emitters like China and the EU in adopting targets to reach net zero emissions by 2050.

Illness and deaths

Environmental pollution from fossil fuels impacts humans because particulates and other air pollution from fossil fuel combustion cause illness and death when inhaled. These health effects include premature death, acute respiratory illness, aggravated asthma, chronic bronchitis and decreased lung function. The poor, undernourished, very young and very old, and people with preexisting respiratory disease and other ill health are more at risk. Global air pollution deaths due to fossil fuels have been estimated at over 8 million people (2018, nearly 1 in 5 deaths worldwide) and at 10.2 million (2019).

While all energy sources inherently have adverse effects, the data shows that fossil fuels cause the highest levels of greenhouse gas emissions and are the most dangerous for human health. In contrast, modern renewable energy sources appear to be safer for human health and cleaner. The death rate from accidents and air pollution in the EU are as follows per terawatt-hour: coal (24.6 deaths), oil (18.4 deaths), natural gas (2.8 deaths), biomass (4.6 deaths), hydropower (0.02 deaths), nuclear energy (0.07 deaths), wind (0.04 deaths), and solar (0.02 deaths). The greenhouse gas emissions from each energy source are as follows, measured in tonnes: coal (820 tonnes), oil (720 tonnes), natural gas (490 tonnes), biomass (78–230 tonnes), hydropower (34 tonnes), nuclear energy (3 tonnes), wind (4 tonnes), and solar (5 tonnes). As the data shows, coal, oil, natural gas, and biomass cause higher death rates and higher levels of greenhouse gas emissions than hydropower, nuclear energy, wind, and solar power. Scientists propose that 1.8 million lives have been saved by replacing fossil fuel sources with nuclear power.

Phase-out

Just transition

Divestment

Industrial sector

In 2019, Saudi Aramco was listed and it reached a US$2 trillion valuation on its second day of trading, after the world's largest initial public offering.

Economic effects
Air pollution from fossil fuels in 2018 has been estimated to cost US$2.9 trillion, or 3.3% of the global gross domestic product (GDP).

Subsidies

Lobbying activities

See also

 Abiogenic petroleum origin – a proposal that petroleum is not a fossil fuel
 Bioremediation
 Carbon bubble
 Eco-economic decoupling
 Environmental impact of the energy industry
 Fossil Fools Day
 Fossil Fuel Beta
 Hydraulic fracturing
 Liquefied petroleum gas
 Low-carbon power
 Peak coal
 Peak gas
 Phase-out of fossil fuel vehicles
 Shale gas

Notes

References

Further reading
 Barrett, Ross; Worden, Daniel (eds.), Oil Culture. Minneapolis, MN: University of Minnesota Press, 2014.
 Bob Johnson, Carbon Nation: Fossil Fuels in the Making of American Culture. Lawrence, KS: University Press of Kansas, 2014.

External links

 Global Fossil Infrastructure Tracker 
 Centre for Research on Energy and Clean Air